Jane Slack-Smith (born 27 August 1966) is a former Australian racing cyclist. She won the Australian national road race title in 1989.

References

External links

1966 births
Living people
Australian female cyclists
Place of birth missing (living people)